Anna Frebel (born 1980 in Berlin) is a German astronomer working on discovering the oldest stars in the universe.

Career 

Anna Frebel grew up Göttingen, Germany. After finishing high school, she began studying physics in Freiburg im Breisgau but did not finish the physics program and did not obtain a physics degree there. Instead she enrolled in an astronomy program in Australia, where she obtained a PhD in Astronomy from the Australian National University's Mount Stromlo Observatory  in Canberra. A W. J. McDonald Postdoctoral Fellowship brought her to the University of Texas  at Austin in 2006, where she continued her studies.

From 2009 to 2011, she was a Clay Postdoctoral Fellow at the Center for Astrophysics  Harvard & Smithsonian in Cambridge (Massachusetts). Since 2012 she is an assistant professor of physics at the Massachusetts Institute of Technology.

In 2005, Frebel discovered the star HE 1327-2326, which is the most iron-deficient star, stemming from a time very shortly after the Big Bang. In 2007 she also discovered the red giant star HE 1523-0901, which is about 13.2 billion years old.

Awards and honors 
 2007: Charlene-Heisler-Prize for the best astronomy PhD in 2006 in Australia
 2009: Opening presentation XLAB Science Festival, Göttingen
 2009:  Ludwig Biermann Award (Young Astronomer Award) of the German Astronomical Society 
 2010: Annie J. Cannon Award  of the American Astronomical Society
 2010: Lise Meitner Lecturer, Göttingen and Innsbruck
 2011: Kavli Frontiers of Science Fellow, National Academy of Sciences
 2022: Fellow of the American Physical Society

Publications (selection)

References

External links 
 Anna Frebel at MIT
 Anna Frebel Princeton University Press
 Anna Frebel, fischerverlage.de

21st-century German astronomers
Women astronomers
Living people
1980 births
Recipients of the Annie J. Cannon Award in Astronomy
Ludwig Biermann Award winners
Scientists from Göttingen
21st-century German women scientists
Massachusetts Institute of Technology faculty
Fellows of the American Physical Society